The 1943–44 Montreal Canadiens season was the club's 35th season, 27th in the National Hockey League (NHL). The team would win the Stanley Cup for the fifth time. Bill Durnan would join the club as its new goaltender and he won the Vezina Trophy in his rookie season.

Offseason
At the Habs' training camp in 1943, Canadiens manager Tommy Gorman settled on Durnan as his goalie. Durnan stated that he was happy as an amateur and happy with less money if it meant avoiding the stress of the professional game. On opening night, Durnan was not yet signed. Ten minutes before the first faceoff, he spoke with Gorman and reached a deal. Durnan signed the contract and played in the game. The result was a 2–2 draw with the Boston Bruins. The rookie netminder was a few months shy of his 27th birthday.

Regular season
Some of Durnan's teammates included the Punch Line of Elmer Lach, Rocket Richard and Toe Blake. Durnan was a key element that took Montreal back to the Stanley Cup after 13 years of frustration. Durnan led the league in games played, wins and goals-against average in the regular season.

Final standings

Record vs. opponents

Schedule and results

Playoffs
In the Stanley Cup playoffs, Durnan allowed only 1.53 goals per game as the Canadiens skated to the title. At season's end, Durnan was awarded the Vezina Trophy, the first rookie to win the award, and was selected to the league's First All-Star Team.

Semi-final: Montreal vs. Toronto
Rocket Richard scored seven goals in the series, including all five for Montreal in game two. After giving up the first game at home to Toronto, Montreal took over, winning the next four, finishing the series with an 11–0 shellacking in game five.

Stanley Cup Final: Montreal vs. Chicago

Maurice 'Rocket' Richard made his Stanley Cup debut with a five-goal performance in the series, including a hat-trick in game two. The Punch Line of Richard, Elmer Lach and Toe Blake scored 10 of the Canadiens 16 goals. Blake scored the Cup winner in overtime. In the same overtime, Bill Durnan stopped the first penalty shot awarded in the finals, awarded to Virgil Johnson.

Montreal wins best-of-seven series 4–0.

Player statistics

Regular season
Scoring

Goaltending

Playoffs
Scoring

Goaltending

Awards and records
Bill Durnan, Vezina Trophy
Bill Durnan, NHL First Team All-Star
Emile "Butch" Bouchard, Defense, NHL Second Team All-Star
Elmer Lach, Centre, NHL Second Team All-Star
Maurice Richard, Right Wing, NHL Second Team All-Star
Dick Irvin, Coach, NHL First Team All-Star

See also
 1943–44 NHL season
 List of Stanley Cup champions

References
Canadiens on Hockey Database

Stanley Cup championship seasons
Montreal Canadiens seasons
Montreal
Montreal